Yampil is a common toponym (place name) in Ukraine:

Raions
Yampil Raion, Sumy Oblast
Yampil Raion, Vinnytsia Oblast

Cities
 Yampil, Vinnytsia Oblast, Capital city of Yampilskiy Rayon located in Vinnytsia Oblast

Urban-type settlements
 Yampil, Donetsk Oblast, an urban-type settlement in Donetsk Oblast
 Yampil, Khmelnytskyi Oblast, an urban-type settlement in Khmelnytskyi Oblast
 Yampil, Sumy Oblast, an urban-type settlement and raion center of Sumy Oblast

Villages
 Yampil, Lviv Oblast, a village in Lviv Oblast
 Yampil, Cherkasy Oblast, a village in Cherkasy Oblast

See also 
 Yampolsky